Maïna Kataki, née Juliette Pierre-Marie and nicknamed Nishtatai (1923 – 20 November 2011 in Pune, India) was a French-born feminist author based in Pune, India. She is known in the field of postcolonial foreign charity activities in India.

Early life 
Kataki was born in Paris. She then moved to Pune in 1970 after being attracted to the spiritual aspects of Indian culture. 

She became an Indian citizen in 1976. where she taught at the university level in slums and villages where she founded the Samarpan Ashram in 1983.

Bibliography 
Kataki is the author of La Joie d'Être, which is an autobiographical account of L'Inde Secrète des Villages. It details a young woman's attempt at reforming village practices in relation to medicine. She also wrote Femme de Pierre ou Femme de Chair where she expressed her views on feminism.

References

1923 births
2011 deaths
French emigrants to India
French women writers
Recipients of the Ordre national du Mérite